James Steven Jodat (March 3, 1954 – October 21, 2015) was a professional American football player who played running back for seven seasons for the Los Angeles Rams, the Seattle Seahawks, and the San Diego Chargers.

He was a high school player for Pio Nono in St. Francis, Wisconsin. He played college football at Carthage College in Kenosha, Wisconsin (declining more attractive offers because Carthage was closer to his widowed mother's home in Milwaukee). He died from cancer in 2015.

References

1954 births
2015 deaths
Players of American football from Milwaukee
American football running backs
Los Angeles Rams players
Seattle Seahawks players
San Diego Chargers players
Carthage Firebirds football players